Xenoarchaeology, a branch of xenology dealing with extraterrestrial cultures, is a hypothetical form of archaeology that exists mainly in works of science fiction. The field is concerned with the study of the material remains to reconstruct and interpret past life-ways of alien civilizations. Xenoarchaeology is not currently practiced by mainstream archaeologists due to the current lack of any material for the discipline to study.

Etymology
The name derives from Greek xenos (ξένος) which means 'stranger, alien', and archaeology 'study of ancients'.

Xenoarchaeology is sometimes called astroarchaeology or exoarchaeology, although some would argue that the prefix exo- would be more correctly applied to the study of human activities in a space environment.

Other names for xenoarchaeology, or specialised fields of interest, include Probe SETI (Search for Extra-Terrestrial Intelligence), extraterrestrial archaeology, space archaeology, SETA (Search for Extra-Terrestrial Artifacts), Dysonian SETI, Planetary SETI, SETT (Search for Extra-Terrestrial Technology), SETV (Search for Extra-Terrestrial Visitation), extraterrestrial anthropology, areoarchaeology and selenoarchaeology.

Justification
It is arguably the case that, due to the immense distances between stars, any evidence we discover of extraterrestrial intelligence, whether it be an artifact or an electromagnetic signal, may come from a long-vanished civilization. Thus the entire SETI project can be seen as a form of archaeology. Additionally, due to the extreme age of the universe, there may be a reasonable expectation for astrobiology research to produce evidence of extinct alien life prior to the discovery of alien life itself.

The study of alien cultures might offer us glimpses into our own species' past or future development.

Vicky Walsh argued for the existence of "exo-artifacts" using the principle of mediocrity and the Drake equation. She proposed that a theoretical and speculative field of archaeology be established in order to test outlandish claims and to prepare for a time when undeniably extraterrestrial artifacts needed to be analysed. "If it is possible to construct an abstract archaeology that can be tested and refined on earth and then applied to areas beyond our planet, then the claims for ETI remains on the moon and Mars may really be evaluated in light of established archaeological theory and analysis".

Ben McGee similarly proposed the creation of a set of interdisciplinary, proactive xenoarchaeological guidelines, arguing that identifying suspected artifacts of astrobiology is all that is required to justify establishing a methodology for xenoarchaeology.  He emphasized the necessity of proactive xenoarchaeological work in order to avoid future bias, mischaracterization, and information mismanagement, and he cites three scenarios under which such a methodology or set of guidelines would be useful, those being "remote sensing" of a potential xenoarchaeological artifact, encountering an artifact during "human exploration,"  and "terrestrial interception" of an artifact.

Greg Fewer has argued that archaeological techniques should be used to evaluate alleged UFO landing or crash sites, such as Roswell.

History
The origins of the field have been traced to theories about a hypothetical Martian civilization based on observations of what were perceived as canals on Mars. These theories, of which Percival Lowell was the most famous exponent, were apparently inspired by a mistranslation of a quote by Giovanni Schiaparelli.

The 1997 Theoretical Archaeology Group conference featured a session on "archaeology and science fiction".

The 2004 annual meeting of the American Anthropological Association featured a session Anthropology, Archaeology and Interstellar Communication.

Planetary SETI
Planetary SETI is concerned with the search for extraterrestrial structures on the surface of bodies in the Solar System. Claims for evidence of extraterrestrial artifacts can be divided into three groups, the Moon, Mars, and the other planets and their satellites.

Examples of sites of interest include the "bridge" sighted in the Mare Crisium in 1953, and the "Blair Cuspids", "an unusual arrangement of seven spirelike objects of varying heights" at the western edge of the Mare Tranquillitatis, photographed by the Lunar Orbiter 2 on 20 November 1966. In 2006, Ian Crawford proposed that a search for alien artifacts be conducted on the Moon.

Percival Lowell's mistaken identification of Martian canals was an early attempt to detect and study an alien culture from its supposed physical remains. More recently, there was interest in the supposed Face on Mars, an example of the psychological phenomenon of pareidolia.

The Society for Planetary SETI Research is a loose organization of researchers interested in this field. The organization does not endorse any particular conclusions drawn by its members on particular sites.

Probe SETI, or SETA

A great deal of research and writing has been done, and some searches conducted for extraterrestrial probes in the Solar System. This followed the work of Ronald N. Bracewell.

Robert Freitas, Christopher Rose and Gregory Wright have argued that interstellar probes can be a more energy-efficient means of communication than electromagnetic broadcasts.

If so, a solar centric Search for Extraterrestrial Artifacts (SETA) would seem to be favored over the more traditional radio or optical searches.
Robert A. Freitas coined the Term  seta in the 1980s.

On the basis that the Earth-Moon or Sun-Earth libration orbits might constitute convenient parking places for automated extraterrestrial probes, unsuccessful searches were conducted by Freitas and Valdes.

Dysonian SETI
In a 1960 paper, Freeman Dyson proposed the idea of a Dyson sphere, a type of extraterrestrial artifact able to be searched for and studied at interstellar distances. Following that paper, several searches have been conducted.

In a 2005 paper, Luc Arnold proposed a means of detecting smaller, though still mega-scale, artifacts from their distinctive transit light curve signature. (see Astroengineering).

Criticism 
Xenoarchaeology is referred to as 'pseudoarcheology' by some circles of archaeologists and critics of the concept of 'ancient aliens'. The idea of xenoarchaeology has been popularized in non-academic television programs such as the History Channel series Ancient Aliens, which uses a strategy known as 'fire-hosing' to co-mingle fact with fiction in order to spread theories of an alternate past that normalizes white supremacist, nativist, imperialist, settler-colonial, and Christian perspectives. Researchers and scholars featured as guests on the show often profess to be a part of an oppressed minority of academics that 'big archaeology' refuses to acknowledge or attempts to disenfranchise. This claim of being a maverick or a rogue absolves these individuals of their frequent lack of credentials to legitimately comment on the field of archaeology. Xenoarchaeology prioritizes well-known, monumental archaeological structures, a criticism of early archaeology the field of xenoarchaeology perpetuates. In claiming these monuments could have only been constructed with extraterrestrial intervention, xenoarchaeologists or alien astronaut theorists are also claiming that the often non-white Indigenous people in the regions in which these monuments appear could not have built them on their own. Additionally, these alien saviors are often portrayed as light-skinned or Aryan in complexion, as prominent alien astronaut theorist Erich von Däniken claims in his work Chariots of the Gods, which has been considered a cornerstone in the field of xenoarchaeology for the last five decades. This re-structuring of the past undercuts the achievements and contributions of Indigenous people to human history that they have had and continue to have. Xenoarchaeology has been used in the United States to justify the genocide of Indigenous peoples on this continent. "The notion that the ancestors of Native Americans were not the first or only people on the continent has great popularity among white nationalists, who see it as a means of denying Native Americans an ancestral claim on their land".

Fringe theories
A subculture of enthusiasts studies purported structures on the Moon or Mars. These controversial "structures" (such as the Face on Mars) are not accepted as more than natural features by most scientists, examples of the pareidolia phenomenon.

Palaeocontact or ancient astronaut theories, espoused by Erich von Däniken and others, are further examples of fringe theories. These claim that the Earth was visited in prehistoric times by extraterrestrial beings.

Science fiction

Xenoarchaeological themes are common in science fiction. Works about the exploration of enigmatic extraterrestrial artifacts have been satirically categorized as Big Dumb Object stories.

Some of the more prominent examples of xenoarchaeological fiction include Arthur C. Clarke's novel Rendezvous with Rama, H. Beam Piper's short story Omnilingual, and Charles Sheffield's Heritage Universe series.

Novels

 2001: A Space Odyssey by Arthur C. Clarke
 Broken Angels by Richard Morgan
 Gateway by Fred Pohl
 Grass by Sheri S. Tepper
 Heritage Trilogy by Ian Douglas
 Noon Universe by Strugatsky brothers.
 Rendezvous With Rama by Arthur C. Clarke
 Revelation Space by Alastair Reynolds
 Ringworld (and its sequels) by Larry Niven
 Saga of Seven Suns (Most notably Book 1: Hidden Empire) by Kevin J. Anderson
 Strata by Terry Pratchett
 The Engines of God by Jack McDevitt
 The Gaea Trilogy by John Varley
 The Giants series by James P. Hogan
 The Hercules Text by Jack McDevitt
 The novels in the Heritage Universe by Charles Sheffield
 The Past of Forever (Children of the Stars, Book 4) by Juanita Coulson
 The Season of Passage by Christopher Pike
 The Voyage of the Space Beagle by A. E. van Vogt

Short stories
 "At the Mountains of Madness" by H. P. Lovecraft
 "Old Testament" by Jerome Bixby
 "Omnilingual" by H. Beam Piper
 "The Sentinel" by Arthur C. Clarke
 "The Vaults of Yoh-Vombis" by Clark Ashton Smith
"The Adventure of Tintin: Flight 714 to Sydney" by Herge

Video games

 Alien Legacy
 Aliens versus Predator
 Aliens vs. Predator
 Borderlands
 Civilization: Call to Power
 Dead Space
 Doom 3
 Freelancer
 FreeSpace
Gateway
 Halo series
 Marathon 2: Durandal
 Mass Effect
Master of Orion
 Metal Fatigue
 Outer Wilds
 RAMA (based on Clarke's novel)
 Resistance
Sid Meier's Alpha Centauri
Star Trek: A Final Unity
 Star Wars: Knights of the Old Republic
 StarCraft series
 Stellaris
 The Dig
 The Lacuna Expanse
 Wing Commander: Privateer

Movies

 A Genesis Found
 Alien
 Alien vs. Predator
 Alien: Covenant
 Black Mountain Side
 Chariots of the Gods
 Contact
 DC Extended Universe
 Doom
 Forbidden Planet
 Indiana Jones and the Kingdom of the Crystal Skull
 Indiana Jones and the Last Crusade
 Indiana Jones and the Raiders of the Lost Ark
 Indiana Jones and the Temple of Doom
 Outlander
 Prometheus
 Sphere
 Star Wars
 Stargate
 The Box
 The Fifth Element
 The Last Lovecraft: Relic of Cthulhu
 Total Recall
 Uncharted

Television

 Ancient Aliens
 Babylon 5
 Doctor Who
 Martian Chronicles
 Star Trek
 Stargate
 Stargate SG-1 and its spinoff Stargate Atlantis

See also
 Pseudoarchaeology
 Xenolinguistics

References

External links
 Martian "artificial structures"
 Space archaeology

Extraterrestrial life
Science fiction themes
Ufology
Pseudoarchaeology
Hypothetical technology
Astrobiology